Desiarchis is a genus of moths in the Carposinidae family. It contains the single species Desiarchis hemisema, which is found in Burma.

References

Natural History Museum Lepidoptera generic names catalog

Carposinidae
Monotypic moth genera